Kastrup Glasværk was a Danish glassworks located in Copenhagen, Denmark. Kastrup Glasværk was also the parent company of Hellerup Glasværk,  in Odense and Aarhus Glasværk in Aarhus.

History
Kastrup Glasværk was founded on 12 October 1847 by Christian Conrad Sophus Danneskiold-Samsøe. He has inherited Holmegård glassworks at Næstved from his mother in 1943. The company was converted into an aktieselskab in 1873. In 1881, the company acquired Tuborg Fabrikers Glasværk whouse name was subsequently changed to Hellerup Glasværk. In 1883, the company also took over Godthaab Glasværk in Helsingør. In 1907, Kastrup Glasværk acquired  in Odense and Frederiksberg Glasværk.  comprised Fyns Glasværk in Odense (founded on 11 June 1874) and Aarhus Glasværk in Aarhus (founded 1898). In 1918, Aalborg Glasværk in Aalborg (founded in 1853) was acquired.

In 1865, Kastrup Glasværk merged with Holmegaard under the name . The principal shareholders were Carlsberg Group, De forende Bryggerier and Elisabeth Lassen who had inherited Holmegaard from her father (count Aage Danneskiold-Samsøe) in 1945. The merged company had about 1,935 employees. The and a total production of about 102,000 tonnes. Production ceased in 1879.

Headquarters
Kastrup Glasværk was from 1892 headquartered at Nørre Voldgade 12 in central Copenhagen. The Historicist building was designed by the architect Philip Smidth. The company name is still seen on the facade. The building is now home to Teknisk Landsforbund.

Products
Kastrup Glasværk was initially a manufacturer of bottles. The production was automatized in 1912. The company later also began to manufacture other products such as drinking glass, tableware, flasks, bell jars and light fixtures.

References

Defunct glassmaking companies
Glassmaking companies of Denmark
Danish companies established in 1847